José Mendoza López (July 10, 1910 – May 16, 2005) was a Mexican-born United States Army soldier who was awarded the United States' highest military decoration for valor in combat — the Medal of Honor — for his heroic actions during the Battle of the Bulge, in which he single-handedly repulsed a German infantry attack, killing at least 100 enemy troops.

Early years
López was raised by his mother Cándida López in the town of Santiago Ihuitlán Plumas, Oaxaca, Mexico. As a young boy, he and his mother moved to the city of Orizaba, where he helped his mother sell clothes that she made as a seamstress in the city. However, his mother died of tuberculosis when he was only eight years old. López then relocated to Brownsville, Texas, United States, to live with his uncle's family.

While living in Brownsville, López began working various jobs to bring in income and never returned to school. As a young man, López caught the attention of a boxing promoter, and for seven years he traveled the country fighting a total of 55 fights in the lightweight division with the nickname of Kid Mendoza. In 1934, during a boxing match in Melbourne, Victoria, Australia, he met a group of Merchant Marines and signed a contract with them. He was accepted in the union in 1936 and spent the next five years traveling the world.

He was en route to California from Hawaii on December 7, 1941, when he learned about the Japanese attack on Pearl Harbor. When he arrived in Los Angeles, the authorities believed he was Japanese, and he was forced to prove otherwise.

López returned to Brownsville and, in 1942, married Emilia Herrera. That same year, he received his draft card and relocated to San Antonio, where he enlisted in the Army. López was first sent to Fort Sam Houston, Texas, and then to Camp Roberts, California, where he received his basic training.

Medal of Honor citation

On his own initiative, he carried his heavy machine gun from Company K's right flank to its left, in order to protect that flank which was in danger of being overrun by advancing enemy infantry supported by tanks. Occupying a shallow hole offering no protection above his waist, he cut down a group of 10 Germans. Ignoring enemy fire from an advancing tank, he held his position and cut down 25 more enemy infantry attempting to turn his flank. Glancing to his right, he saw a large number of infantry swarming in from the front. Although dazed and shaken from enemy artillery fire which had crashed into the ground only a few yards away, he realized that his position soon would be outflanked. Again, alone, he carried his machine gun to a position to the right rear of the sector; enemy tanks and infantry were forcing a withdrawal. Blown over backward by the concussion of enemy fire, he immediately reset his gun and continued his fire. Single-handed he held off the German horde until he was satisfied his company had effected its retirement. Again he loaded his gun on his back and in a hail of small arms fire he ran to a point where a few of his comrades were attempting to set up another defense against the onrushing enemy. He fired from this position until his ammunition was exhausted. Still carrying his gun, he fell back with his small group to Krinkelt. Sgt. López's gallantry and intrepidity, on seemingly suicidal missions in which he killed at least 100 of the enemy, were almost solely responsible for allowing Company K to avoid being enveloped, to withdraw successfully and to give other forces coming up in support time to build a line which repelled the enemy drive.

Post-World War II
López received an enthusiastic reception when his ship landed in New York City and he was greeted by New York Mayor Fiorello La Guardia. On a visit to Mexico City, he was greeted by the president of Mexico, Manuel Ávila Camacho, and awarded Mexico's highest military commendation, la Condecoración del Mérito Militar.

He later moved his family to San Antonio, where he was hired as a contact representative with the Veterans Administration. Upon the outbreak of the Korean War, López was accidentally ordered to serve for his country and without hesitation was prepared to do so, until President Harry S. Truman, heard of and corrected the matter so that López could remain in the United States.

José Mendoza López died one year after his wife; they were together for 62 years.

Namesakes
The city of Mission, Texas, López' hometown, named a street and a city park — José M. López Park — in his honor.

The North East Independent School District in San Antonio, Texas, named a school in his honor, José M. López Middle School.

A statue of Sgt. López stands in Brownsville's Veterans Park.

Awards and decorations
Among José M. López's decorations and medals were the following:

See also

List of Hispanic Medal of Honor recipients
Hispanic Americans in World War II

Notes

References

External links

1910 births
2005 deaths
United States Army personnel of World War II
World War II recipients of the Medal of Honor
United States Army Medal of Honor recipients
United States Army personnel of the Korean War
Foreign-born Medal of Honor recipients
United States Army soldiers
People from San Antonio
People from Mission, Texas
Mexican-born Medal of Honor recipients
Mexican emigrants to the United States
Mexican people of Spanish descent
Burials at Fort Sam Houston National Cemetery
People from Orizaba
United States Department of Veterans Affairs officials